Blanca de Castejón (May 13, 1906 – December 26, 1969) was a Puerto Rican actress who is best remembered for her work in the Golden Age of Mexican cinema, especially her award-winning supporting role in Escuela de vagabundos. She was born in Comerío, Puerto Rico, and died in Mexico City.

Life and career
Blanca de Castejón Otero was born in Comerío, Puerto Rico, to Rafael Castejón Arnáiz, a telegraph operator, and Josefa Otero Rivera, a housewife. Had a younger sister named Margarita, a dancer.

She made her film debut in El impostor (1931), one of three films she made for Fox's Spanish-language unit. After stops in Mexico City and Havana, where she worked in the theater, Castejón went to Buenos Aires, where she made two feature films: Crimen a las tres (1935, a box-office flop) and Por buen camino (1935).

By the late 1930s she returned to Hollywood and starred in Spanish-language films, notably Mis dos amores (1938), starring the popular Mexican star Tito Guizar, and Los hijos mandan (Gabriel Soria, 1939), with Fernando Soler and Arturo de Córdova. Castejón co-wrote the screenplay of Los hijos mandan and both films were produced by Puerto Rican Rafael Ramos Cobián. The actress was married to Mexican actor Rafael Banquells when she relocated to Mexico City and joined the national film industry, where she made about thirty movies, taking part in what is known as the Golden Age of Mexican Cinema. Though she initially starred in melodramas like La razón de la culpa (Juan José Ortega, 1943), with Pedro Infante and María Elena Marqués, and Divorciadas (Alejandro Galindo, 1943), with René Cardona and Delia Magaña, Blanca de Castejón became best known for her supporting roles in comedies with popular comedians like Luis Sandrini and Fernando Soler. She won the 1954 Ariel award (Mexico's version of the Oscars) for her supporting role as a ditzy socialite in Escuela de vagabundos (School for Tramps), a very popular remake of the 1938 screwball comedy Merrily We Live, which reunited her with Pedro Infante.

Blanca de Castejón died in Mexico City, in 1969.

Selected filmography
El impostor (1931)
Resurrection (1931)
Eran trece / There Were Thirteen (1931) - Peggy Minchin (credited as Blanca Castejón)
 Mis dos amores (1938)
Los hijos mandan (1939)
La razón de la culpa (1943) - María de la Paz
Ave sin nido (1943) - Anita de Medina
Divorciadas (1943) - Cristina
¡Ya tengo a mi hijo! (1946)
Los maridos engañan de 7 a 9 (1946)
Cuide a su marido (1950)
Nosotras las taquígrafas (1950) - Blanquita
Todos son mis hijos (1951)
Mamá nos quita los novios (1952)
Prefiero a tu papá (1952)
Escuela para vagabundos / School for Tramps (1955)
Escuela para suegras / School for Mothers-In-Law (1958)
Mientras el cuerpo aguante (1958)

See also
List of Puerto Ricans

References

External links

1906 births
1969 deaths
People from Comerío, Puerto Rico
Puerto Rican film actresses
Puerto Rican stage actresses
Puerto Rican television actresses
20th-century American actresses
20th-century Puerto Rican actresses